Events of 2019 in Poland.

Incumbents

 President – Andrzej Duda (independent, supported by Law and Justice)
 Prime Minister – Mateusz Morawiecki (Law and Justice)
 Marshal of the Sejm – Marek Kuchciński (Law and Justice) (until 9 August), Elżbieta Witek (Law and Justice) (since 9 August)
 Marshal of the Senate – Stanisław Karczewski (Law and Justice) (until 11 November), Tomasz Grodzki (since 12 November)

Events

January
January 4 – Koszalin escape room fire
January 13 – Paweł Adamowicz, the mayor of Gdańsk, is stabbed during a live charity event in Gdańsk by a former inmate, who was released from prison a month prior to the assassination. Adamowicz dies the following day from his injuries, at the age of 53.

March
March – the town of Świdnik in eastern Poland passed a resolution rejecting "LGBT ideology".

April
 April 1 — Priests in Gdańsk burn Harry Potter books.
April 8 — Polish teachers began a strike initiated by Polish Teachers' Union

May
23 May – 15 June – The 2019 FIFA U-20 World Cup took place

July
 20 July: Białystok equality march attacked by thousands of members of far-right groups, hooligan football fans, and others. The New York Times, compared the publish shock to the reaction to the Unite the Right rally in Charlottesville.

August
 August: the Archbishop of Kraków Marek Jędraszewski said the "LGBT ideology" were like a "rainbow plague" in a sermon commemorating the Warsaw uprising.

October
 13 October: The governing  Law and Justice (PiS) government wins Reelection, with an increased popular vote of 43%, the highest vote share by any party since Poland returned to democracy in 1989.

November
 24 November: Junior Eurovision Song Contest 2019 is held in Gliwice. Poland's representative, Viki Gabor, also wins the event, making Poland the first country to win the competition twice in a row and the first host nation to win.

December
 20 December: The governing  Law and Justice (PiS) government passes the Polish Supreme Court Disciplinary Chamber law

Births

Deaths

January
 14 January – Paweł Adamowicz, mayor of Gdańsk (b. 1965).

February 
 1 February –  Bożena Aksamit, Journalist (b. 1966)
 7 February –  Jan Olszewski, 3rd Prime Minister of Poland (b. 1930)

March 

 23 March – Maria Iwaszkiewicz, writer (b. 1924)

April 

 17 April – Ryszard Kaja, stage designer (b. 1962)

June 
 7 June – Ryszard Bugajski, film director (b. 1943)
 17 June – Zbigniew Horbowy, glassware designer (b. 1935)

July 
 8 July – , writer (b. 1919)
 20 July – Wiktor Jędrzejec, graphic designer, (b. 1961)

August 
 6 August – Krystyna Dańko, humanitarian (b. 1917)
 18 August – Andrzej Buszewicz, actor (b. 1934)

September 

 18 September – Leszek Elektorowicz, poet (b. 1924)
 28 September Jan Kobuszewski, actor (b. 1934)

October 
 14 October – Bohdan Butenko, cartoonist (b. 1931)
 20 October – Andrzej Heidrich, graphic artist (b. 1928)

See also
 	

 		
 2019 European Parliament election

References

 
Poland
Poland